Jarkko Kalevi Ahola  (born 24 August 1977, in Toijala) is a performing artist, a composer and a singer. He is the vocalist and bass player and one of the three songwriters of the band Teräsbetoni. He is also a member of a Finnish symphonic metal cover supergroup Northern Kings together with Marko Hietala from Nightwish, Tarot and Sapattivuosi, Tony Kakko from Sonata Arctica and Juha-Pekka Leppäluoto from Charon and Harmaja.

Other bands Jarkko has been involved with are Dreamtale, Cosmic Spell and Helmisetti. In addition, Jarkko has taken part in the Raskasta Joulua project incorporating the sound of metal to Christmas carols. He is a lefthanded bass player.
In 2013 took part in the project Forces United, where he acted in the role of vocalist. The project also took part Maxim Samosvat, Konstantin Seleznev, Daria Stavrovich

Discography

Albums
as part of Ahola

Solo (as Jarkko Ahola)

References

External links
 J. Ahola Homepage
 Official AHOLA Homepage

1977 births
Living people
Finnish heavy metal bass guitarists
Finnish heavy metal singers
Finnish male singer-songwriters
21st-century Finnish singers
21st-century bass guitarists
Northern Kings members
Eurovision Song Contest entrants of 2008
Eurovision Song Contest entrants for Finland